North District is a district home to 126,446 people located in Tainan, Taiwan.

Geography
 Population: 126,229 people (January 2023)
 Area: 10,434 km2

Administrative divisions
The district consists of Kaiyuan, Tungxing, Lihang, Zhenxing, Renai, Dafeng, Zhongxing, Heshun, Zhengjiao, Chenggong, Wenyuan, Dagang, Zhonglou, Gongyuan, Yuanbao, Yongxiang, Chengde, Wencheng, Dahe, Xianbei, Zhangsheng, Gexing, Beimen, Xiaobei, Daguang, Daxing, Zhangxing, Beihua, Huade, Fude, Liren, Shuangan and Yuanmei Village.

Education
 National Tainan Second Senior High School
 Sheng Kung Girls' High School

Infrastructures
 National Cheng Kung University Hospital

Tourist attractions
 Da Kuan-yin Ting Xing-ji Gong
 Kai-ji Goddess Temple
 San-shan Guo-wang Temple
 Tainan Children's Science Museum
 Tainan Cultural and Creative Park
 Tainan Flower Night Market
 Tainan Park
 Xiao-bei Tourist Night Market
 Xi-hwa Temple

See also
 Tainan

References

Districts of Tainan